Tony's Chocolonely is a Dutch confectionery company founded in 2005, which produces and sells chocolate. In 2018, the company's market share in the Netherlands was 18 percent, making it one of the country's largest chocolate manufacturers.

History 
In 2002, after discovering that almost all of the chocolate produced at the time had links to slave labor, Dutch television producer and journalist Teun van de Keuken began producing programs about abuses within the cocoa industry on his show Keuringsdienst van Waarde. Along with this, he also requested to be prosecuted for knowingly purchasing an illegally manufactured product, although the prosecutors declined to do so.

After three years of unsuccessful attempts to change the industry through investigative efforts, Van de Keuken decided to start producing chocolate bars himself. The brand was called "Chocolonely" in reference to Van de Keuken feeling as if he was the only person in the industry who was interested in eradicating slavery. The product quickly became a success, with Van de Keuken selling 20,000 bars in two days.

In 2007, after the company was sued by a Dutch importer of Swiss chocolates, a court in Amsterdam ruled that there was sufficient evidence that the company's products were manufactured without the help of slaves. In the same year, the Dutch Media Authority (Comissariaat voor de Media) found that the excessive advertising Tony's Chocolonely received in seven episodes of Keuringsdienst van Waarde generated the company "more than normal profits", and fined the broadcaster of the show 20 thousand euros.

When a hazelnut milk chocolate bar was added to the lineup in 2010, Dutch TV show Een Vandaag reported that 9-year-old children participated in the Turkish hazelnut harvest. The company responded by immediately switching to a local hazelnut supplier from the Netherlands. The same year, the market share of the brand exceeded 4.5 percent in the Netherlands.

In 2011, Henk Jan Beltman became a majority shareholder and moved the company to a new location near Westergasfabriek.

Tony's cocoa mass has been fully traceable since 2013, and its cocoa butter since 2016.

With production steadily increasing, the company decided in 2015 to expand their business to the United States, opening their first international office in Portland, Oregon.

By the end of 2018, in addition to its home country of The Netherlands, Tony's Chocolonely was also on sale in Belgium, Denmark, Finland, Germany, Sweden, and the United States.
In the Netherlands its market share was 19% in 2018, with which it surpassed multinationals Verkade, Mars and Nestlé.

In 2019, Tony's launched their chocolate bars in the United Kingdom, with Sainsbury's, Waitrose, Ocado, Mega Image and Whole Foods being some of the first stores to stock their products.

The chocolate bar was made available in Ireland from 2019 in a limited capacity. , it has become more widely available in leading food stores such as Supervalu.

In 2021, the company received backlash after the American organization Slave Free Chocolate removed Tony's from their list of ethical chocolate companies. While there were no confirmed instances of child labor within Tony's supply chain, their collaboration with another chocolate manufacturer, Barry Callebaut, resulted in Tony's removal from the list due to issues of child labor within Barry Callebaut's supply chain.

Products 
The number of available bar flavors varies by country and distribution channel. For example, over a dozen flavors are available in the Netherlands. The chocolate bars are unevenly divided, symbolizing the unequal distribution of incomes in the chocolate industry.

In the United States, the available flavors of the chocolate bars are (in order of introduction):
 Milk chocolate 32%
 Extra dark chocolate 70%
 Milk caramel sea salt 32%
 Dark almond sea salt 51%
 Dark milk pretzel toffee 42%
 Dark pecan coconut 51%
 Milk hazelnut 32%
 Milk honey almond nougat 32%
 White raspberry popping candy 28%

While types of products vary in a similar fashion to flavor count, most regions have:
 Large bars (180 grams)
 Small bars (50 grams)
 Tiny Tony's (9 grams)
 Seasonal items (including holiday bars and chocolate Easter eggs)

Items unavailable outside of Europe include:
 Personalized chocolate bars
 Chocolate milk
 Chocolate letters

The company introduces three new chocolate bar flavors each year between October and December. The most popular of the three limited editions is then added to the exclusive collection, and sometimes the permanent collection. The company also produces limited edition 'relay' bars for the supermarket chain Albert Heijn, with exclusive flavors corresponding to winter and summer tastes. These flavors rotate every six months. Some bars have entered the permanent collection from there.

Awards 
In 2020, the company was named the most sustainable brand in the Netherlands for the third time by the Sustainable Brand Index. However, this award does not measure brands' actual sustainability, rather, it is based on consumers' perceptions of it.

In 2022, the Thomson Reuters Foundation awarded Tony's Chocolonely the Stop Slavery Award in the category "Goods and Services Companies". This award recognizes companies and organizations who have set a high standard for eradicating slavery, illegal child labor, and human trafficking from their supply chains. The company teamed up with Ben and Jerry's, only to end up embarrassed when their partner's suppliers were found to be employing illegal child labor months later.  

Tony's Chocolonely was ranked third on the 2022 Chocolate Scorecard, which rates chocolate companies according to their human rights and environmental credentials: traceability and transparency, living income for cocoa farmers, child labour (absence of), deforestation & climate, agroforestry, and agrochemical management.

References

External links
 
 
 

Food and drink introduced in 2005
Dutch chocolate companies
Contemporary slavery in Africa
Benefit corporations
Certified B Corporations in the Food & Beverage Industry